Sattar Hamedani born 7 June 1974 in Tabriz) is a retired Iranian football player. He usually played in the midfielder position.

Club career
He played for a few clubs, including Tractor S.C., Keshavarz F.C., Payam Khorasan, Bahman F.C., Esteghlal F.C., Al Nasr, Pas F.C. and Shirin Faraz Kermanshah F.C. He served his golden days in Esteghlal.

International career
Hamedani made 41 appearances for the Iran national football team and was a participant at the 1998 FIFA World Cup.

Honours
Esteghlal
 Iranian Football League: 2000–01
Hazfi Cup: 1999–00, 2001–02

Career statistics

International goals

References

External links

1974 births
Living people
Sportspeople from Tabriz
Iranian footballers
Pas players
Tractor S.C. players
Payam Mashhad players
Shirin Faraz Kermanshah players
Keshavarz players
Esteghlal F.C. players
Saba players
1998 FIFA World Cup players
2000 AFC Asian Cup players
Iran international footballers
Al-Nasr SC (Dubai) players
Iranian expatriate footballers
Asian Games gold medalists for Iran
Bahman players
UAE Pro League players
Asian Games medalists in football
Footballers at the 1998 Asian Games
Association football midfielders
Medalists at the 1998 Asian Games